Cochise County Airport  is a county-owned public-use airport in Cochise County, Arizona, United States. This airport is included in the FAA's National Plan of Integrated Airport Systems for 2009–2013, which categorized it as a general aviation facility.

Facilities and aircraft 
It has one runway designated 3/21 with an asphalt surface measuring 6,095 by 75 feet (1,858 x 23 m).

For the 12-month period ending April 15, 2008, the airport had 8,500 aircraft operations, an average of 23 per day: 94% general aviation and 6% military. At that time there were 25 aircraft based at this airport: 96% single-engine and 4% helicopter.

References

External links 
 Cochise County Airport (P33) at Arizona DOT
 Aerial image as of 1 June 1996 from USGS The National Map
 
 

Airports in Cochise County, Arizona